Kadhalar Dhinam is a 1999 Indian Tamil-language romance film written and directed by Kathir. It is based on a love relationship which begins through an internet chatroom and takes a turn after the protagonist has second thoughts about the relationship after finding out his lover's true identity. The film stars newcomer Kunal and Sonali Bendre (her Tamil debut), while Nassar, Manivannan, Goundamani and Chinni Jayanth appeared in supporting roles. The film produced by A. M. Rathnam, had music composed by A. R. Rahman and cinematography by P. C. Sriram. The film was released on 9 July 1999, while a partially reshot dubbed Hindi version, Dil Hi Dil Mein was released on 21 April 2000. The film received positive reviews and was a commercial success. The film was also dubbed in Telugu as Premikula Roju.

Plot
Raja is from a very poor, illiterate family, from Tamil Nadu. People from his region consider that "education is meant only for the rich". There, poor boys are made to work from age five, either at factories or farms, so that they can support their families. Raja's dad is a violent alcoholic. He spends half of the family's income on alcohol. Raja's family struggles to survive hard every day. But, Raja's mother forced his father to let Raja finish high school, without doing any other work. But he refuses to fund him, and orders him to start work as accountant for their landlord.  Raja's mom begs him to move to Mumbai to start a new life. Raja heeds his mom's pleas and moves to Mumbai to attend under graduate entrance exam at Ramachandra Institute of Management Studies, the top-most premier b-school in India.

The movie starts at a train station on New Year Day, 1999. Raja talks with a manager / veteran colonel named Manivannan in the station. Due to insistence, Raja goes into a flashback. Three years ago, he reaches Mumbai, where he plans to get admitted into the prestigious Ramachandra College of management, one of the most premier institutes in the nation. He gains admission for an MBA program at the Ramachandra College in Mumbai, though he was in 41st rank, in admission tests, for the 40 member class, courtesy of the college chairman, Dr.Ramachandra, but he doesn't realize this at first. He thinks that he managed to get a seat due to his own abilities. This was because Ramachandra saw Raja sleeping on the same enclave-side bench, where he had slept without having anything else than the thought of providing quality education to all, 40 years ago. Ramachandra was born to a poor illiterate family and his father abandoned them after his sister's birth. Out of his desire to become a student, his mother rents the baby sister for beggars, to pay fees. But the poor baby dies and this pushes Ramachandra to create the best institute in India, by hard work. He brings up his daughter, in a humble manner, all alone after the death of his wife.

Raja meets Roja through the Internet. After a brief introduction, Raja and Roja started loving each other. They have yet to see each other and thus, they sent their pictures through e-mail to each other. As Roja checks her e-mail and sees Raja's photo, Raja enters the Net Cafe where Roja was. Then, they meet each other. They are initially shocked by seeing each other as Roja told him that she is in America and Raja told her that he is in London, although they were both in India and were studying in the same college.

The very next day, Raja meets Roja again in the train station where he usually comes to board the train. Again they are both surprised and were speechless when they saw each other. However, things take a turn for the bad when they are both unable to express their feelings about each other due to fated accidents. Raja wanted to see if Roja really likes him by asking her to wear a rose on her head. But, as she walks towards the train station, her rose drops off. Unaware of this, Raja believes that Roja really doesn't like him. Ramachandra meets him and tells him to be practical. He suggests that Raja should write her a love letter. As Raja doesn't know how to write one, Ramachandra helps him. Even his daughter, Roja, helps him write a letter for Raja, unaware that it was for Raja that the father was writing it.

The next day, Raja meets her in the train station and gives her his books, with the love letter inside of it. Not knowing why he gave her his books, she just skims through his books, accidentally causing his love letter to fly away. However, Roja does write a love letter to him too. As she returns his books, a long-lost friend of Raja meets him on the train station. Raja writes the address on the first page of the book and tears it off to give to his friend. Unfortunately, he wasn't aware that Roja wrote her love-letter right behind it. He feels disappointed and doesn't show interest to Roja, causing her to think that he doesn't like her. Ramachandra comes to the rescue again and asks Raja to write another love letter and give it to her the next day, which happens to be Valentine's Day. When Raja comes to express his love for Roja, he finds out that Roja is the daughter of Ramachandra, who has decided to fix his daughter up with Rajesh Gupta, a smart and wealthy golf player who completed his MBA degree in America. Rajesh's father owns the second best private university in India and wants to merge his with Ramachandra's. Roja makes a last attempt to find out if Raja likes her or not. She sends him an e-mail stating that she loves him. On the other hand, Raja doesn't want to hurt the feelings of his beloved guide and teacher, whom he respects as his father. Thus, he sends her an e-mail stating that he is unable to return his feelings for Roja. Roja begrudgingly agrees to the wedding, assuming that Raja will never fall in love with her.

Raja comes to the wedding, but leaves the hall to go back to his hometown, which goes back to the beginning of the story. Coincidentally, Ramachandra overhears his conversation between Raja and his friends and realizes that he is in love with his daughter. He goes to the train station to stop Raja, asking him to return and propose to his daughter. Raja and Ramachandra reach the wedding hall just in time to stop the wedding from taking place. But as they make their way, Roja faints due to ingesting poison in a suicide attempt. Raja comes and rescues Roja and she is saved.

Raja and Roja are married on Valentine's Day, and the movie ends with showing them marrying.

Cast

Hindi version

Production
Kathir, being an inveterate surfer of the cybercafes of Chennai and Bangalore, decided to make a film on what he felt the internet could develop and be used for - romance. He initially titled the film as Lovers Day and began pre-production work in 1997, before giving the project a Tamil title. Kathir got to visit a newly opened cyber cafe in Bangalore and the "way that picture downloaded, slowly, frame by frame, was mind-blowing. Something struck me and I rushed out to write the basic one-liner of Kadhalar Dhinam". The film came as a successor to his 1996 blockbuster Kadhal Desam produced by K. T. Kunjumon. Since Rathnam was not aware about internet, Kathir created comedy track of Goundamani "to make it reach audiences".

Actor Shaam was amongst the auditionees for the debut lead role, before Kunal Singh was selected after Kathir spotted him outside a Bangalore cybercafe. The Pune-based, Kunal Singh, had been in Bangalore only to bulk up his body before joining the army, but with the offer chose to make a career in films. Kathir had scouted for a non-Tamil actress to play the lead role and subsequently Sonali Bendre was signed on to play the lead role in the film, making her debut in Tamil films. Isha Koppikar had also been considered for the film, but after finalising Bendre, Kathir then recommended her to his friend K. S. Ravi to cast her in his En Swasa Kaatre (1999).  For the launch of the film, the makers flew in models Lara Dutta, Laila Rouass and Rani Jeyraj to attend the launch event of the film. Rambha appeared in an item number in the film. For a song sequence in the film, red rose petals were used to cover the forecourt of the Taj Mahal in Agra.

Release
Kadhalar Dhinam released on 9 July 1999. The film initially featured a different climax where Roja dies after taking tablets, but after release, the ending was altered to give a happy ending. The Times of India gave the film a negative review stating that "Kadhalar Dhinam is typically Kadhir. It's big, it's beautiful and it doesn't work." Indolink rated it 1.5 stars, citing, "Kaadhalar Dhinam needed to show a flair for a good story, screenplay and powerful dialogues. What Kadhir ended up with was a sagging script ... and a star cast whose characters lacked the necessary depth for this kind of a love story." Kalki wrote that Kathir gave "www touch" to the same old love story of Tamil cinema. Music and cinematography makes this old story look like a new film.

Hindi version
Director Kathir had actually reshot scenes in Hindi featuring actor Kunal and Anupam Kher to replace the Kunal-Manivannan tracks by conversing in Hindi while Johnny Lever's scenes replaced the Goundamani tracks (Even though he appeared briefly for the "Chand Aaya Hai" song) with the same Titanic hairdo. Chinni Jayanth's part was portrayed by Raju Shreshta in Hindi however scenes involving Kunal and Chinni in Tamil were dubbed in Hindi. Even the tracks dubbed from the Tamil version were reshot with Hindi synchronization sans for the first line of "Roja Roja". Actor Nasser, though dubbed in Hindi, had given his Hindi synching in the song "Sawar Gayee". Though actors Kunal and Sonali Bendre had synched their dialogues in Hindi, the rest of the film was dubbed and became a failure at box office.

Soundtrack

Tamil

Hindi

Telugu

References

External links
 
 
 

1999 films
Indian multilingual films
1990s romantic musical films
Indian romantic musical films
Films about the education system in India
Films about poverty in India
1990s Tamil-language films
Films scored by A. R. Rahman
Films set in Mumbai
Films shot in Mumbai
Films set around New Year
Films about the Internet
Films shot in New Zealand
Films directed by Kathir